Royal Dolhain F.C., usually known as Dolhain or RDFC, is an amateur Belgian association football club from Limbourg in Belgium, that currently competes in the 7th League (formerly known as Provincial first division) of the Belgium League System.

History
The club was founded in 1898 with René Jonckers as the first president and is considered one of the oldest established football clubs in Belgium. The first field was on the premises, that is where current deposit and municipal fire station. A beautiful beech stood in the middle of the lawn, where this "object could not be tolerated" at the time. The field was then dragged behind the castle Peltzer, opposite the factory Ordibel, then the city Carlier.

Mascot
The club has a mascot, a little dog named Rubis Filée, simply known as Rubis.

Current squad

Actual team squad of Royal Dolhain FC.

References

External links
 Official website 
Dolhain at weltfussballarchiv.com 

Football clubs in Belgium
Association football clubs established in 1898
R. Dolhain F.C.
R. Dolhain F.C.
R. Dolhain F.C.
R. Dolhain F.C.